The Very Best of Blancmange is a double CD compilation album by Blancmange, released on 16 July 2012 by Rhino Records. It is composed of singles, album and non-album tracks, and remixes from their first three studio albums. It contains one new track, "Making Aeroplanes (Without Victoria)".

Track listing
All songs are written by Neil Arthur & Stephen Luscombe, except where noted.

CD 1
 "Living on the Ceiling" (7" Mix) – 4:03
 "Don't Tell Me" (7" Mix) – 3:32
 "I Can't Explain" – 4:02
 "Feel Me" (7" Mix) – 5:06
 "Blind Vision" – 3:59
 "Waves" (7" Mix) – 4:09
 "The Day Before You Came" (7" Remix) - 5:51 (Andersson/Ulvaeus)
 "I've Seen the Word" (7" Mix) – 3:06
 "God's Kitchen" (7" Mix) – 2:55
 "That's Love, That It Is" (7" Mix) – 4:25
 "Wasted" (Extended Version) – 4:19
 "Lose Your Love" (Album Version) – 4:04
 "What's Your Problem" (7" Mix) – 4:12
 "Kind" – 3:58
 "All Things Are Nice" – 4:59
 "Murder" – 5:58
 "Running Thin" (Peel Session) – 2:20
 "I Would" (Peel Session) – 4:06
 "Making Aeroplanes (Without Victoria)" - 3:57 [New Track 2012]

CD 2
 "Blind Vision" (12" Mix) – 9:39
 "Don't Tell Me" (12" Mix) – 6:24
 "Feel Me" (12" John Luongo Mix) – 7:03
 "Game Above My Head" (Long Version) – 7:10
 "That's Love, That It Is" (Remix Extended Version) – 7:34
 "Vishnu" (Short Version) – 4:44
 "God's Kitchen" (12" Mix) - 4:28
 "Sad Day" (Original Version) – 3:10
 "Waves" (Original Version) – 4:23
 "Why Don't They Leave Things Alone?" – 4:36
 "Lorraine's My Nurse" – 2:32
 "See the Train" – 2:05
 "Don't You Love It All" – 4:33
 "Living on the Ceiling" (Long Version) – 5:38
 "Hello Darling" (Blue World) – 5:58 (Stephen Luscombe)

References

2012 compilation albums
Blancmange (band) compilation albums